Immortal Combat, also known as Resort to Kill is a 1994 action film directed by Dan Neira.  The plot involves an East-meets-West buddy scenario, starring martial artist Sonny Chiba, wrestler Roddy Piper, Meg Foster and Tiny Lister.

Plot
An L.A. police officer (Roddy Piper) and an exchange officer from Asia (Sonny Chiba) became good friends. They are also reincarnated Mayan warriors. When their undercover drug operation at a high-end hotel fails, they are targeted by the products of an evil corporation, HybriCo run by Quinn (Meg Foster). Foster is known for producing invincible, ninja warriors for international distribution. An unstoppable monster named Lister causes mayhem for the heroes. Deron McBee, fresh off his stint as Malibu on American Gladiators plays the final heavy "Signature Killer."  It served an excellent audition for a later role in Mortal Kombat. And it turns out, if you behead them or burn them with fire, they are not so immortal.

Cast
 Sonny Chiba as Jiro "J.J." Jintani
 Roddy Piper as John Keller
 Meg Foster as Quinn
 Deron McBee as Muller
 Tommy "Tiny" Lister Jr. as Yanagi
 Woon Young Park as Osato
 Lara Steinick as Andy
 Roger Cudney as Stan
 Kim Morgan Greene as Karen Keeler
 George Belanger as Captain Edwards
 Hiroyasu Fujishima as Hiro
 Mario Ivan Martinez as Dr. Edward Collier
 Mineko Mori as Jill
 Michael Sabatino as Rudy
 Craig Mally as Davis (uncredited)
 Pamela Roth as Andy's Mother (uncredited)
 Chris Jericho as Cameo (uncredited)

Response

IGN Movies rated the movie a solid two out of five.

References

External links 
 
 

1990s action films
1994 films
Japan in non-Japanese culture
1990s English-language films